Iestyn Thomas (born 15 December 1976) is a former Wales international rugby union player. In April 2012, he retired from rugby due to injury.

Club career
A prop forward, Thomas started his rugby career with home-town club Pontypool RFC, but later moved to the top division with Ebbw Vale RFC. He was Mike Ruddock's choice as captain as he successfully kept Ebbw Vale in the league and had an impressive campaigns in the Parker Pen Cup. In 2002, Thomas joined Llanelli RFC with 11 Welsh caps to his name. He progressed to the Scarlets regional team, for whom he played in more than 200 games over a nine-year career.

International career
Thomas made his international debut for Wales on 11 November 2000 at the Millennium Stadium in Cardiff against Samoa; Wales won the match 50–6. He then came off the bench in matches against the USA and South Africa.

Thomas played in three matches in the 2002 Six Nations, as well as playing two Tests against the Springboks in South Africa, and against New Zealand at the end of the year.

After playing in the 2003 Six Nations Championship, and playing in two Tests for Wales in June, Thomas was included in Wales' 2003 Rugby World Cup squad, where he played in three matches.

References

External links
Profile at scarlets.co.uk
Profile at wru.co.uk
Profile at ercrugby.com

1976 births
Living people
Barbarian F.C. players
Ebbw Vale RFC players
Llanelli RFC players
People educated at West Monmouth School
Pontypool RFC players
Rugby union players from Pontypool
Rugby union props
Scarlets players
Wales international rugby union players
Welsh rugby union players